Paul Carson was a Canadian sports broadcaster. His work included hosting Sports Page on Vancouver station CKVU-TV, and he was a founder of the Team 1040 all sports radio station, CKST in Vancouver.

He died of pancreatic cancer on December 21, 2010 at the age of 60.

References

1950 births
2010 deaths
Canadian radio sportscasters
Canadian television sportscasters
Deaths from cancer in British Columbia
Deaths from pancreatic cancer
People from London, Ontario